Stryków  is a town in central Poland, in Łódź Voivodeship, in Zgierz County. It has 3,428 inhabitants (2020).

History

Early history
The first mention of Stryków was in 1387. Stryków was a village situated on the route from Zgierz to Lowicz. Stryków received city rights in 1394 from King Wladyslaw Jagiello, at the request of the heir of the town founder, Strykowskiego Deresława. In the middle of the eighteenth century, the city had 45 artisans (13 clothiers, 5 merchants and shopkeepers, and 5 others) and was a local center of commerce and crafts. It was also a center of aristocratic wealth.

In 1744 the town received the privilege of organizing eight fairs a year. Stryków belonged to medium-sized cities. Textile manufacturing was attempted by the then owner Felix Czarnecki but without success. The town economy remained centered on crafts and agriculture. Contemporary activities have left traces of the old town in the form of an existing semi-circular square in the city center.

After the Second Partition of Poland, Strykow was in the Prussian sector, and later in the period 1807–15 in the Duchy of Warsaw and then in the Russian-controlled Polish Kingdom, from 1867 on as part of Piotrków Governorate. In the nineteenth century Stryków lost its civic rights. The reason for the stagnation of population growth was the rapid development of nearby Łódź and rapidly growing Pabianice and Zgierz.

Modern history
In 1902 Stryków was linked by rail to Warsaw and Łódź, which was followed by population growth. This rail link was closed for some years but was reopened in October 2011. Shortly after receiving civic independence in 1923, Strykow recovered as a town, with the economy based on shoemaking and tailoring. In Stryków yarn and textiles were produced, and there was a brickyard.

The town had approximately 5,000 inhabitants in 1939 when the German troops arrived to occupy the town.  About 2000, or 40 percent, were Jewish. They were abused constantly by the German policemen and the local ethnic German population. Their possessions were stolen.  After being forced into an overcrowded ghetto (up to eight people shared each room) with no sewage system, in 1942 they were rounded up.  Some were sent to the Lodz ghetto and most to the Chelmno death camp where they were gassed immediately. Only around 20 survived the war.

Poles in the town were used as forced labor during the German occupation.  The town was 45% smaller after the war due to the outflow of local Germans who moved west with the retreating German troops, the murder of almost the entire Jewish community, and deaths in the Polish community.

Northwest of the center of Stryków, are the remains of the Jewish cemetery, where the last burial took place in 1946.

In the post-war period, Stryków has become a bedroom community for the Łódź metropolis - many residents working in Łódź or in Zgierz and the new industrial estates. Stryków now has many great opportunities, being located at the intersection of the two major highways in Poland, A-1 and A-2.

References

External links

 

Cities and towns in Łódź Voivodeship
Zgierz County
Piotrków Governorate
Łódź Voivodeship (1919–1939)
Holocaust locations in Poland